Glen Hope is a borough in Clearfield County, Pennsylvania, United States. The population was 127 at the 2020 census.

Geography
Glen Hope is located in southern Clearfield County at  (40.798959, -78.500320), primarily on the northern side of Clearfield Creek, a northeastward-flowing tributary of the West Branch Susquehanna River. Pennsylvania Route 53 passes through the borough, leading northeast  to Madera and southwest  to Irvona. Pennsylvania Route 729 crosses Clearfield Creek and PA-53 in the center of town and leads northwest  to Grampian and southeast  to Janesville.

Demographics

As of the census of 2000, there were 149 people, 55 households, and 44 families residing in the borough. The population density was 72.0 people per square mile (27.8/km2). There were 59 housing units at an average density of 28.5 per square mile (11.0/km2). The racial makeup of the borough was 99.33% White, and 0.67% from two or more races.

There were 55 households, out of which 29.1% had children under the age of 18 living with them, 67.3% were married couples living together, 9.1% had a female householder with no husband present, and 18.2% were non-families. 14.5% of all households were made up of individuals, and 10.9% had someone living alone who was 65 years of age or older. The average household size was 2.71 and the average family size was 3.00.

In the borough the population was spread out, with 19.5% under the age of 18, 8.1% from 18 to 24, 28.2% from 25 to 44, 26.2% from 45 to 64, and 18.1% who were 65 years of age or older. The median age was 42 years. For every 100 females there were 93.5 males. For every 100 females age 18 and over, there were 96.7 males.

The median income for a household in the borough was $35,625, and the median income for a family was $42,500. Males had a median income of $31,250 versus $31,250 for females. The per capita income for the borough was $13,321. There were 14.6% of families and 15.7% of the population living below the poverty line, including 25.0% of under eighteens and 7.7% of those over 64.

References

Populated places established in 1878
Boroughs in Clearfield County, Pennsylvania
1878 establishments in Pennsylvania